Disney's Magic Bake-Off is an American baking competition television series produced in partnership with Tastemade, that aired on Disney Channel from August 13 to December 3, 2021. The series is hosted by Issac Ryan Brown and Dara Reneé.

Production 
On April 27, 2021, it was announced that Disney Channel had partnered up with Tastemade to create a new baking competition series, Disney's Magic Bake-Off. Issac Ryan Brown and Dara Reneé were set to host the series. Production was underway with an expected premiere in summer 2021. On June 25, 2021, it was announced that the series would premiere on August 13, 2021.

Episodes

Ratings 
 
}}

References

External links 
 
 

2020s American children's television series
2020s American cooking television series
2021 American television series debuts
2021 American television series endings
Disney Channel original programming
English-language television shows
Food reality television series
Television series by Disney